The 1998 season of the 3. divisjon, the fourth highest association football league for men in Norway.

Between 20 and 22 games (depending on group size) were played in 19 groups, with 3 points given for wins and 1 for draws. All group winners were promoted to the 2. divisjon, as well as some of the best runners-up.

Tables 

Group 1
Manglerud Star – promoted
Kvik Halden – promoted
Sparta
Kolbotn
Oppegård
Borre
Mercantile
Greåker
Lisleby
Tune – relegated
Bækkelaget – relegated
Hafslund – relegated

Group 2
Ullensaker/Kisa – promoted
Rælingen
Raufoss 2
Vardal
Skeid 2
Torp
Selbak
Toten
Røa
Kolbu/KK – relegated
Gjelleråsen – relegated
Lunner – relegated

Group 3
Trøgstad/Båstad – promoted
Moss 2
Grue
Rygge
Kongsvinger 2
Fjellhamar
Askim
Brandval
Holter
Sander – relegated
Kjellmyra – relegated
Nordby – relegated

Group 4
Eidsvold Turn – promoted
Lom
Trysil
Vang
Skjetten 2
Lillehammer FK
Vinstra
Fart
Eidsvold
Brumunddal – relegated
Follebu – relegated
Sel – relegated

Group 5
Asker – promoted
Rjukan
Snøgg
Åmot
Holmen
Strømsgodset 2
Birkebeineren
Fagerborg
Frigg
Kongsberg – relegated
Bygdø – relegated
Slemmestad/Bødalen – relegated

Group 6
Skarphedin – promoted
Fram
Falk
Eik-Tønsberg 2
Teie
Halsen
Flint
Stathelle
Langesund
Skotfoss – relegated
Storm – relegated
Stokke – relegated

Group 7
Tollnes – promoted
Grim/Start 2 – promoted
Kvinesdal
Odd/Pors
Lyngdal
Våg
Vindbjart
Vigør
Sørfjell
Randesund – relegated
Birkenes – relegated
Rygene – relegated

Group 8
Viking 2 – promoted
Figgjo
Skjold
Rosseland
Ganddal
Hundvåg
Bryne 2
Hana
Madla – relegated
Egersund – relegated
Nærbø – relegated
Varhaug – relegated

Group 9
Ny-Krohnborg – promoted
Kleppestø
Åkra
Hald
Kopervik
Odda
Nord
Trott
Bremnes
Torvastad – relegated
Grannekameratene – relegated
Sauda – relegated

Group 10
Radøy – promoted
Follese
Vadmyra
Lyngbø
Florvåg
Løv-Ham
Kjøkkelvik
Nordhordland
Bjørnar
Voss – relegated
Austevoll – relegated
Nymark – relegated

Group 11
Florø – promoted
Tornado – promoted
Eid/Haugen
Fjøra
Dale
Svelgen
Sandane
Høyang
Jølster
Stryn 2 – relegated
Eikefjord
Anga – relegated

Group 12
Ørsta – promoted
Spjelkavik
Brattvåg
Hødd 2
Bergsøy
Stranda
Åram/Vankam
Velledalen og Ringen
Langevåg
Skodje
Valder – relegated
Hareid – relegated

Group 13
Sunndal – promoted
Vestnes Varfjell
Surnadal
Søya
Bøfjord
Ekko/Aureosen
Bud
Grykameratene
Gossen
Isfjorden/Langfjorden – relegated
Kvass/Ulvungen – relegated
Bryn – relegated

Group 14
Tynset – promoted
Tiller
Varden
Singsås
Løkken
Melhus
Fram
OIL/OIF 2 – relegated
Selbu
KIL/Hemne
Røros – relegated
Buvik – relegated

Group 15
Namsos – promoted
Levanger
Nidelv
NTHI
Malvik
Vinne
Verdal 2 – relegated
Freidig
Heimdal
Rørvik – relegated
Tranabakkan – relegated
Kvamskameratene – relegated

Group 16
Stålkameratene – promoted
Brønnøysund – promoted
Saltdalkameratene
Fauske/Sprint
Sandnessjøen
Tverlandet
Mo 2
Sørfold
Nesna
Korgen
Nordre Meløy
Sømna/Tjalg – relegated

Group 17
Sortland – promoted
Leknes
Grovfjord
Flakstad
Vågakameratene
Skånland
Medkila
Landsås
Harstad 2
Beisfjord – relegated
Lofoten 2/Kabelvåg – relegated

Group 18
Skarp – promoted
Nordreisa – promoted
Tromsø 2
Ramfjord
Salangen
Bardu
Tromsdalen 2
Mellembygd/Målselvrelegated
Fløya
Lyngstuva
Storsteinnes
Nordkjosbotn/Balsfjord – relegated

Group 19
Kirkenes – promoted
Honningsvåg
Porsanger (-> Lakselv/Porsanger)
Kautokeino
Nordkinn
Bossekop
Nordlys
Tverrelvdalen
Bjørnevatn – relegated
Sørøy Glimt
Lakselv (-> Lakselv/Porsanger)

References

Norwegian Third Division seasons
4
Norway
Norway